Schoriina is a genus of trilobite, an extinct group of marine arthropods. The only known species is S. elegans.

References 

Cambrian trilobites
Paradoxidoidea
Fossils of Russia
Fossil taxa described in 1971